This is a list of films produced in Sweden and in the Swedish language in the 1940s. For an A-Z see :Category:Swedish films.

1940

1941

1942

1943

1944

1945

1946

1947

1948

1949

External links
 Swedish film at the Internet Movie Database

1940s
Films
Swedish

nl:Lijst van Zweedse films
zh:瑞典電影列表